Andrée Martinerie (17 April 1917 – 1997) was a 20th-century French women writer, laureate of the prix des libraires on 1961.

Biography 
An aggregée of classical letters, Andrée Martinerie began her career by translating important authors such as Fitzroy Maclean, Herman Wouk, Irwin Shaw, L.P. Hartley and Mika Waltari. In 1961 she published a first novel, Les autres jours which obtained the Prix des Libraires. She never stopped publishing novels until the tragedy that cost two of her three grandchildren (1980). The only testimony and the album she will publish after this drama will be devoted to the latter.

Andrée Martinerie was the wife of André Bertrand, a lawyer, and the mother of Christine Chambaz-Bertrand, a specialist in George Sand.

Work 
1961: Les Autres Jours, prix des libraires, éditions Gallimard, 
1964: Le Rêve familier, éditions Grasset
1968: L'Été d'une vie, Grasset
1970: Quand finira la nuit ?, Grasset, ASIN B003CO95PC
1976: Une fille de vingt ans, Grasset,  
1980: L'Espace d'un cri, Grasset
1982: Une passion de grand-mère, éditions Robert Laffont, 
1985: Dis-moi, grand-mère (in collaboration with Geneviève Jurgensen), Robert Laffont

External links 
 Andrée Martinerie on Babelio
 L'espace d'un cri / Andrée Martinerie Martine on Gallica

20th-century French non-fiction writers
French women novelists
Prix des libraires winners
People from Ain
1917 births
1997 deaths
20th-century French women writers